Johann Michael Fischer (18 February 1692 – 6 May 1766) was a German architect in the late Baroque period.

Fischer was born in Burglengenfeld, Upper Palatinate.  He is a major representative of south German Baroque architects. He studied in Bohemia and combined Bohemian elements with Bavarian Baroque traditions. He often co-operated with the most gifted Bavarian artists of his time, such as Cosmas Damian Asam and Egid Quirin Asam, Johann Joseph Christian, Johann Michael Feuchtmayer, Matthäus Günther, Ignaz Günther, Franz Joseph Spiegler, Johann Baptist Straub, and Johann Baptist Zimmermann.

Fischer died, aged 74, in Munich, and is buried in the Munich Frauenkirche.

Main Works

Fischer designed 32 churches and 23 monasteries in southern Germany. Among these, the best-known are the following.

Bavaria
Aufhausen—Pilgrimage Church of Maria Schnee (1736–1751)
Benediktbeuern—Anastasia Chapel in the Church of St. Benedikt (1750–1758), considered a jewel of Baroque architecture
Dießen am Ammersee—Church of St. Maria (completed 1739)
Fürstenzell—Church of the Ascension of the Blessed Virgin (completed 1728)
Munich—Franciscan Monastery Church of St. Anna im Lehel (consecrated 1737)
Munich—Parish Church of St. Michael (1737–1752)
Niederalteich—Benedictine Monastery of St. Mauritius (first commission for Fischer) (1724–1726)
Osterhofen Abbey—Papal Basilica of St. Margaretha (1727–1740)
Ottobeuren—Benedictine Monastery Church of the Holy Trinity (1737–1766), considered one of the most magnificent churches of the Baroque era
Rott am Inn—Benedictine Abbey Church of St. Marinus and St. Anianus (1759–1767)

Baden-Württemberg
Kisslegg—Neues Schloss (New Castle) (1721–1727)
Wiblingen Abbey—Benedictine Monastery Church of St. Martin (1714–1783), built by Johann Georg Specht based on designs by Fischer
Zwiefalten—Zwiefalten Abbey (1741–1747), considered a model of integrated Baroque design

Disputed Works
Several works have been attributed to Fischer that are now disputed, although his style was an obvious influence:

Erling-Andechs—Pilgrimage Church Mariae Verkündiging and Monastery
Haigerloch—Pilgrimage Church of St. Anne
Murnau—Parish Church of St. Nikolaus

References

1692 births
1766 deaths
German Baroque architects
Rococo architects
Architects of the Bavarian court
Burials at Munich Frauenkirche
People from Schwandorf (district)